Blankenese is a 1994 German television series, which originally aired on ARD. The series focused on the Nicholaisons, a fictional ship owning family located in Blankenese, Hamburg.

See also
List of German television series

External links
 

1994 German television series debuts
1994 German television series endings
Television shows set in Hamburg
German-language television shows
Das Erste original programming